Mehdi-Sélim Khelifi (born September 1, 1992) is an Algerian cross-country skier who has competed since 2009. He finished 84th in the 15 km event at the 2010 Winter Olympics in Vancouver, British Columbia, Canada. He was the flag bearer for the opening ceremony.

Khelifi's best career finish was 26th in an individual sprint event at Germany in January 2010.

References

External links
 

1992 births
Algerian male cross-country skiers
Cross-country skiers at the 2010 Winter Olympics
Living people
Olympic cross-country skiers of Algeria
21st-century Algerian people